John Hobart, 1st Earl of Buckinghamshire,  (11 October 169322 September 1756) was a British politician who sat in the House of Commons from 1715 to 1728, when he was raised to the peerage as Baron Hobart.

Early life

Hobart was the son of Sir Henry Hobart, 4th Baronet of Blickling and his wife Elizabeth Maynard, and he inherited his father's title when the latter was killed in a duel in 1698. He was admitted at Clare College, Cambridge in 1710. He married firstly Judith Britiffe (half-sister of Elizabeth, wife of William Morden) in 1717 and secondly Elizabeth Bristow in 1728.

Career
Hobart was returned unopposed as Member of Parliament for St Ives at the 1715 general election. He became Vice Admiral of Norfolk in 1719, holding the post until his death. In 1721 he became Lord of Trade. He was elected MP for St Ives in a contest in 1722.  At the 1727 general election he was returned as MP for Bere Alston and for Norfolk. He chose to sit for Norfolk but vacated his seat in 1728 when he was raised to the peerage as Baron Hobart of Blickling at the coronation of King George II. His sister, the Countess of Suffolk, was a longtime mistress of the King. In 1727, he became Treasurer of the Chamber (until 1744) and assay master of the stannaries (until 1738). He was appointed Lord Lieutenant of Norfolk in 1739, captain of the Gentleman Pensioners in 1744 and Privy Councillor in 1745. In 1746 he was created Earl of Buckinghamshire.

Death and legacy
Hobart died aged 62 on 22 September 1756. He was succeeded by his sons John by his first marriage and then George by his second marriage.

References

Burke's Peerage & Gentry

|-

1693 births
1756 deaths
British MPs 1715–1722
British MPs 1722–1727
British MPs 1727–1734
1
Knights Companion of the Order of the Bath
Lord-Lieutenants of Norfolk
Members of the Privy Council of Great Britain
Hobart, John
Hobart, John
Honourable Corps of Gentlemen at Arms
John